Mount Morrison is a mountain,  high, standing between Midship Glacier and the head of Cleveland Glacier in the Prince Albert Mountains of Victoria Land, Antarctica. It was discovered by the British National Antarctic Expedition (1901–04) and named after J.D. Morrison of the Morning, a relief ship to the expedition.

References

Mountains of Victoria Land
Scott Coast